is a Japanese rock band originally active from 1982 to 1996. The members of Scanch met and formed the band in 1982 - while they were still in high school. The band started with Rolly, shima-chang, Obata Pump and Doctor Tanaka as members.

By the year 1990, they had their debut carried out from CBS/Sony. Dr. Tanaka left the band in 1993 and as a new keyboardist for the band they got Ogawa Bunmei. The remaining members continued the band until 1996.

The band was greatly inspired by Led Zeppelin, Queen, Sweet and other 1970s style music. After the band broke up, the lead singer, Rolly, has been very successful in his solo career. shima-chang took part in a band called Funny Honey Pie. Bunmei has also formed a band of his own called Suzy Cream Cheese.

Scanch has also lent their songs "Bomber Love" and "Koi no T.K.O." to the anime K.O. Beast.

Members
Rolly – guitar, vocals
shima-chang – bass, vocals
 – drums
 – keyboards
 – support bass (2010–present)

Former members
 – keyboards (died 2014)

Discography
Studio albums

Scanch'n Roll Show (1988)

Opera (1993)
Gold (1994)
Double Double Chocolate (1995)
Scanch'n Roll Show II (2006)

Singles

"You You You" (1993)

Compilation albums
Sweets (1994)
Historic Grammar (1996)
Star Box Extra (2001)
The Best of Scanch (2005)
30th (2012, self cover album)

External links
 Rolly's Official Site
 shima's Official Site
 Obata's Official Site
 Bunmei's Official Site

Musical groups established in 1982
1982 establishments in Japan
Japanese rock music groups
Japanese glam rock musical groups